Parramatta Power Soccer Club was an Australian professional association football club based in Parramatta, Sydney. The club was formed in 1999 and joined the National Soccer League in the 1999–2000 season through to the final season of the National Soccer League in the 2003–04 season.

The club's first team spent five seasons in the National Soccer League. The table details the club's achievements in major competitions, and the top scorers for each season.

History
Since the foundation of Parramatta Power in 1999, they played their inaugural National Soccer League in the 1999–2000 season where they finished 11th out of 16. The next two seasons had the team miss out on the Finals series until the 2002–03 season resulted with Parramatta Power finishing 3rd qualifying for the Championship Rounds finishing in 4th. Their final season in 2003–04 resulted with the regular season and finals series finish as runners-up both to the Perth Glory.

Key
Key to league competitions:

 National Soccer League (NSL) – Australia's former top football league, established in 1977 and dissolved in 2004.

Key to colours and symbols:

Key to league record:
 Season = The year and article of the season
 Pos = Final position
 Pld = Matches played
 W = Matches won
 D = Matches drawn
 L = Matches lost
 GF = Goals scored
 GA = Goals against
 Pts = Points

Seasons

References
General
 

Specific

Parramatta Power SC